The AN/SPS-52 is a United States Navy long-range air search 3D radar that is capable of providing contact bearing, range and altitude. It was replaced by the AN/SPS-48 on newer ships and ships that received upgrades. The antenna is mechanically rotated for azimuth but electronically scanned for elevation.



Gallery

See also
 List of radars

External links
 GlobalSecurity AN/SPS-52
 Firecontrolman - SPS-52 section - via Tpub

Sea radars
Military electronics of the United States
Military equipment introduced in the 1960s